Canucha is a genus of moths belonging to the subfamily Drepaninae. The genus was erected by Francis Walker in 1866.

Species
Canucha bouvieri Oberthür, 1916
Canucha curvaria Walker, 1866
Canucha duplexa (Moore, [1866])
Canucha miranda Warren, 1923
Canucha specularis (Moore, 1879)
Canucha sublignata (Warren, 1902)

References

Drepaninae
Drepanidae genera